Susan Jane Berman (May 18, 1945 – December 23, 2000) was an American journalist and author. The daughter of mobster David Berman, she wrote about her late-in-life realization of her father's role in organized crime.

In 2000, Berman was found murdered in her home. The case went unsolved for over a decade until real-estate heir Robert Durst, Berman's longtime friend and confidant, was charged with her murder in 2015 and convicted in 2021.

Early life
Susan Berman was born in Minneapolis, Minnesota, in 1945, the only child of the former Betty Ewald, a traveling dancer who had adopted the stage name Gladys Evans, and David "Davie" Berman. Berman always maintained that her father — a major Jewish-American organized crime figure who took over Las Vegas' Flamingo Hotel after Bugsy Siegel's 1947 gangland murder — died under mysterious circumstances on an operating table when she was twelve, but all indications were that he died of a heart attack during surgery. She also believed uncertainty surrounded her mother's presumed suicide by overdose a year later.

Berman grew up in Las Vegas and, later, in Hollywood, California, where high school classmates and friends at the Chadwick School included Jann Wenner and Liza Minnelli. Berman received a Bachelor of Arts degree in 1967 from the University of California, Los Angeles (UCLA), where she met American real estate heir Robert Durst. In 1969, she graduated with a Master of Arts in journalism from the University of California, Berkeley. Berman was gradually paid a total of $4.3 million by the Mafia for her father's interests in casinos and other properties.

Career
Berman was a novelist and author of two memoirs, along with a 1971 college guidebook, The Underground Guide to the College of Your Choice. Her first memoir, Easy Street, detailed her life as a mobster's daughter. While representing her in the 1970s, the William Morris Agency talked with several Hollywood producers interested in adapting the book into a screenplay. The movie rights were ultimately sold for $350,000, but no film project ever materialized. For a time, Berman attempted to finance a musical based on the Dreyfus affair, in which Durst declined to invest.

In San Francisco, Berman wrote for media outlets including the San Francisco Examiner, Francis Ford Coppola's City Magazine, the Westinghouse Evening Show on KPIX-TV, and the People show on CBS. She was a contributing writer for magazines such as New York, Cosmopolitan and Family Circle. She also wrote Driver, Give a Soldier a Lift! and Lady Las Vegas, accompanying the 1996 release of an A&E documentary, for which she was a co-writer and nominated for a Writers Guild of America award.

At the time of her death, Berman was working on a project for Showtime with attorney Kevin Norte. Entitled Sin City, it was being planned as Showtime's answer to the HBO hit The Sopranos.

Personal life
Berman lived just off the Sunset Strip on Alta Loma Road in West Hollywood for several years prior to her final residence in Benedict Canyon, a suburb of Los Angeles. Her manager, Nyle Brenner, later told the Los Angeles Times that "many details of Ms. Berman's personal life are unclear" and added "she had been married once in the 1980s, and later helped rear the two children of a boyfriend." Berman was married to Christopher "Mister" Margulies, in June 1984 at the Hotel Bel-Air; Durst walked Berman down the aisle. Margulies died of a heroin overdose in 1986. Berman kept close ties to friends on Alta Loma Road, at the Las Vegas Strip and in New York City, including Durst.

Murder
Berman was found murdered execution style with a 9mm handgun on Christmas Eve 2000 in her rented Benedict Canyon home, and was presumed to have been dead at least a day.

On March 14, 2015, Durst was arrested in New Orleans on a first-degree murder warrant issued out of Los Angeles. Although Durst's presumed victim was not immediately named by authorities, the Los Angeles Times first reported that he had been detained in connection to Berman's slaying. Three days after his arrest, Los Angeles District Attorney Jackie Lacey said that if convicted, Durst could face the death penalty in California for "special circumstances of murder of a witness and lying in wait." Durst was transferred to and arraigned in California in early November 2016.

Multiple accounts, including Murder of a Mafia Daughter by author Cathy Scott, have reported possible connections between Berman's murder and the 1982 disappearance of Durst's first wife, Kathleen McCormack Durst. Berman became a confidante of Durst at UCLA in the late 1960s, and came to know McCormack after later moving to New York. In a review of Scott's book, True Crime Zine wrote that "detectives came to suspect one of [Berman's] long-time friends but have never been able to charge him with murder." Durst was also considered a prime suspect in his wife's disappearance and was eventually charged in the case.

Berman initially acted as a media spokesperson for Durst, and is believed to have facilitated his public alibi. She supplied a deposition in the case in 1982, which Durst faxed to investigators after her murder. Berman had remained Durst's friend and received two large cash gifts totaling $50,000 from him in the months before her death; she had last written to Durst on November 5, 2000, expressing hope that her financial entreaties would not ruin their friendship. Earlier in 2000, the New York State Police, at the request of then-Westchester County District Attorney Jeanine Pirro, had re-opened an investigation into Kathleen's disappearance, and was urged by her friends to contact Berman for an interview. Berman was killed weeks after the re-opened investigation was publicized.

Durst's 2015 arrest warrant mentioned a previously undisclosed typewritten letter, mailed from New York on January 9, 2001 to a West Los Angeles police station, titled, "Possible motive for Susan Berman murder." The letter said Berman suspected Durst was involved in his wife's disappearance, and specified that Durst was planning to visit her in late December. Berman biographer Scott told the New York Post in February 2017, before witnesses were to testify against Durst in a pre-trial hearing, that the evidence pointed to his guilt in Berman's murder. Durst was ultimately convicted of Berman's murder on September 17, 2021, and sentenced to life in prison. Two months later, Durst died in prison.

Berman is interred next to her father at Home of Peace Memorial Park in East Los Angeles, California near The Three Stooges including former Stooges Shemp Howard and Curly Howard.

Books

Nonfiction
The Underground Guide to the College of Your Choice (Signet, 1971), 
Easy Street: The True Story of a Mob Family (The Dial Press, 1981), 
Lady Las Vegas: The Inside Story Behind America's Neon Oasis (TV Books, 1996),

Fiction
Driver, Give a Soldier a Lift (Putnam, 1976), 
Fly Away Home (Avon Books, 1996), 
Spiderweb (Avon Books, 1997),

In popular culture
In the 2010 film All Good Things, the character Deborah Lehrman, portrayed by Lily Rabe, is inspired by Susan Berman. The film depicts Lehrman being murdered by the character Malvern Bump, who is inspired by Morris Black. It is implied that Bump murders Lehrman on the orders of David Marks, inspired by Durst, in order to prevent her from revealing incriminating information about Marks.

The story of Susan Berman's suspicious death and suspected murder was covered by a CBS News Productions documentary series 48 Hours, Season 29, Episode 19, "Murder 90210", release date 30 January 2016 (USA).

The case was the basis for the Law & Order: Criminal Intent episode "Maledictus."

References

External links
This American Life episode 76: "Mob"; linked RealAudio file includes a reading by Berman from Easy Street.
Homicide Special: A year with LAPD's Elite Detective Unit, Miles Corwin (2003) Chapter 14

A Deadly Secret: The Strange Disappearance of Kathie Durst (2003) by Matt Birkbeck
Murder of a Mafia Daughter: The Life and Tragic Death of Susan Berman (2002) by Cathy Scott

1945 births
2000 deaths
20th-century American women writers
Organized crime memoirists
20th-century American memoirists
American murder victims
American women memoirists
American people of Ukrainian-Jewish descent
Crime victims in the United States
History of Clark County, Nevada
Jewish American writers
Journalists killed in the United States
Murdered American Jews
Murdered American journalists
Female murder victims
University of California, Los Angeles alumni
UC Berkeley Graduate School of Journalism alumni
People murdered in Los Angeles
San Francisco Examiner people
Deaths by firearm in California
Women crime writers
2000 murders in the United States
20th-century American Jews
American screenwriters